Nepal Dalit Sangh (In English Nepal Dalit Association NDA) is a Nepalese Dalit movement linked to the Nepali Congress. When the Nepali Congress was divided and the Nepali Congress (Democratic) was formed, a splinter Nepal Dalit Sangh (Prajatantrik) was formed as the NC(D) Dalit wing by ratifying the Committee of Ratna Bahadur Bishwakarma, Which was already formed as alternative parallel central committee by agitating with organizing committee in Biratnagar 2nd Convention of Nepal dalit Sangh. With the reunification of NC and NC(D) the NDS and NDS(P) were also reunified, and in August 2007 the Nepali Congress appointed a 39-member ad hoc committee of NDS, with Khadga Bahadur Basyal (Sarki) as president and Jeevan Pariyar as general secretary. Founder of nepal Dalit Sangh are Ratna Bahadur Bishwakarma - Dailekh, Dal Singh Kami- Gorkha, Ganesh Pariyar- Kaski, Padma Singh Bishwakarma- Baglung, Bijul kumar Bishwakarma- Dang and Man Bahadur Bishwakarma -Arghakhachi. Nepal Dalit Sangh was born in 2054 BS. Nepal Bikaswonmukh Samaj Sangh was named Before the name of Nepal Dalit Sangh. 
2012 AD Nepal Dalit Sangh has done its 4th national convention and Mr. Meen Bahadur Bishwakarma has been elected as president. Nepal Dalit Sangh NDS is one of the leading democratic Organization for Dalit community of Nepal. NDs has a 75 members in body of central committee. Dipak Soni was a secretary in central committee of Nepal Dalit sangh till 2021, from January 2022, Mr. Soni is appointed as acting General secretary and Mr. Bhiusen Damai has been newly nominated as secretary for remaining tenure of NDA central committee.  rest of two secretaries are MS. Devika Nepali and Mr. Dharmendra Paswan are also representing to women and madheshi dalit group in the same committee respectively.

References

Dalit wings of political parties in Nepal
Nepali Congress
Nepali Congress

Policy and Programs Nepal Dalit Association and
Statute of Nepal Dalit Association (Nepal Dalit Sangh) 2054 BS (continuous Amendment on 2069 BS)